

Kurt von der Chevallerie (23 December 1891 – missing as of 18 April 1945) was a German general in the Wehrmacht during World War II who commanded the German 1st Army. He was a recipient of the Knight's Cross of the Iron Cross with Oak Leaves. Chevallerie retired from the Army on 31 January 1945 and was missing in action since 18 April 1945 near Kolberg.

See also
 List of people who disappeared

Awards and decorations
 Iron Cross (1914) 2nd Class (1 October 1914) & 1st Class (12 December 1915)
 Austria-Hungary Military Merit Cross 3rd Class with War Decoration (1917)
 Wound Badge in Black (3 March 1918)
 Cross of Honour of the Princely House Order of Hohenzollern with Swords (22 July 1918)
 Honour Cross of the World War 1914/1918 (1935)
 Clasp to the Iron Cross (1939)  2nd Class (12 June 1940) & 1st Class (12 June 1940)
 Commanders Cross of the Hungarian Kingly Order of Merit (12 February 1939)
 Grand Commanders of the Order of the Crown of Italy (27 August 1940)
 Eastern Front Medal (1 September 1942)
 Wound Badge (1939) in Black (16 January 1943)
 Knight's Cross of the Iron Cross with Oak Leaves
 Knight's Cross on 23 October 1941 as Generalleutnant and commander of the 99th Light Infantry Division
 Oak Leaves on 19 December 1943 as General of the Infantry and commander of LIX Army Corps

References

Citations

Bibliography

 
 
 

1891 births
1940s missing person cases
1945 deaths
20th-century Freikorps personnel
German Army generals of World War II
Generals of Infantry (Wehrmacht)
German Army personnel of World War I
Military personnel from Berlin
Missing person cases in Germany
Prussian Army personnel
Recipients of the clasp to the Iron Cross, 1st class
Recipients of the Knight's Cross of the Iron Cross with Oak Leaves
Reichswehr personnel
People from the Province of Brandenburg
Missing in action of World War II